Ram Murti was an Indian politician.  He was elected to the Lok Sabha, the lower house of the Parliament of India from the Bareilly as a member of the Bharatiya Lok Dal. He took an active part in all the movements launched by Mahatma Gandhi since 1930 and was imprisoned various times. He was Member, Uttar Pradesh Legislative Assembly from 1946 to 1969, and from 1974 to 1977, he was Minister in the cabinet led by Hemwati Nandan Bahuguna and N. D. Tiwari.

References

1910 births
Year of death missing
India MPs 1977–1979
Janata Party politicians
Indian National Congress politicians
Indian National Congress (Organisation) politicians
Bharatiya Lok Dal politicians
Politicians from Bareilly
Lok Sabha members from Uttar Pradesh
Uttar Pradesh MLAs 1952–1957
Uttar Pradesh MLAs 1957–1962
Uttar Pradesh MLAs 1962–1967
Uttar Pradesh MLAs 1967–1969
Uttar Pradesh MLAs 1969–1974